Wyrm is a 2019 American comedy film written and directed by Christopher Winterbauer and starring Theo Taplitz as the titular character.  It is Winterbauer's feature directorial debut and based on his short film of the same name.

Cast
Theo Taplitz as Wyrm
Lulu Wilson as Izzy
Cece Abbey as Becky
Lukas Gage as Dylan
Azure Brandi as Myrcella
Sosie Bacon as Lindsey
Rosemarie DeWitt as Margie
Tommy Dewey as Uncle Chet
Natasha Rothwell as V.P. Lister
Dan Bakkedahl as Allen
Jenna Ortega as Suzie

Release 
Wyrm premiered at the 2019 Fantastic Fest. It was shown at the 2020 Florida Film Festival, where it won Best Narrative Feature, and the 2021 Seattle International Film Festival.  The film had a limited theatrical release in the United States on June 10, 2022.

Reception
The film has an 89% rating on Rotten Tomatoes based on 19 reviews.

Reuben Baron of Comic Book Resources gave the film a positive review and wrote, "The worldbuilding in Wyrm, expanded from a short film of the same name, is brilliant."

References

External links